Terence John Mancini (born 4 October 1942) is a former professional footballer who played as a centre-half. Born in England, he earned five international caps for the Republic of Ireland national team.

Playing career
Mancini was born in London, and was originally named Terry Seely. His father (who was Irish) died when Terry was seven and his mother remarried, changing his surname to that of his stepfather. He began his career with Watford, joining the club in 1960 before being released midway through the 1965–66 season. After a 20-month spell in South Africa playing for Port Elizabeth City, he returned to London in November 1967 to join Leyton Orient. He spent four seasons with Orient, winning a Third Division medal in 1969–70.

In October 1971 he signed for Queens Park Rangers, and helped them to promotion to the First Division in 1972–73. Born and brought up in England, after a chance conversation with QPR teammate Don Givens, Mancini found out that through his Irish father, he could play for the Republic of Ireland. He won his first cap against Poland in 1973 and went on to win five in total. Mancini later reported that when he first appeared for the Republic of Ireland, he did not realize that the band was playing the Republic's national anthem, having never heard the tune before. Memorably for him, Mancini’s one international goal came at the Maracana in a friendly against Brazil ahead of the 1974 FIFA World Cup. He was sent off on his last appearance, a 3–0 win over the Soviet Union in October 1974.	

Mancini signed for Arsenal in October 1974 for £20,000. Having made his debut against West Ham United on 26 October 1974, he played for Arsenal for two seasons, recording 62 appearances. However, after Arsenal's worst performance in over forty years in the league (17th) in 1975–76, Arsenal manager Bertie Mee resigned. Mancini was deemed surplus to requirements (being nearly 34) by Mee's replacement Terry Neill, and he was released on a free transfer in September 1976. He joined Aldershot and played a single season with them. He ended his career in the NASL, playing one summer with the Los Angeles Aztecs before returning to England

Non-playing career
As well as playing, during the early 1970s Mancini was an occasional presenter of London Weekend Television's The Big Match, when the programme, in an attempt to distance itself from the more staid Match of the Day, experimented with using current players as presenters.

On 6 November 1974, he judged the 'Children's Photograph Competition', in London, with Kenneth Williams, and others. Williams' diary entry for that day  includes: " When he (Mancini) left, he said to me ' I could stay here all night taking to you...I'd like to meet you again...this could go on forever as far as I'm concerned'. I was pleased and flattered and touched. More than I've been for years":('K.Williams' Diaries':HarperCollins:1993).

After retiring from the game in 1977, Mancini coached several teams, before eventually leaving football altogether and running a variety of businesses.

Honours
Leyton Orient
Football League Third Division: 1969–70

See also
 List of Republic of Ireland international footballers born outside the Republic of Ireland

References

1942 births
Living people
Republic of Ireland association footballers
Footballers from Camden Town
Association football central defenders
Republic of Ireland international footballers
North American Soccer League (1968–1984) players
English Football League players
Watford F.C. players
Port Elizabeth City F.C. players
Leyton Orient F.C. players
Queens Park Rangers F.C. players
Arsenal F.C. players
Aldershot F.C. players
Los Angeles Aztecs players
Barnet F.C. players
Fulham F.C. non-playing staff
Brentford F.C. non-playing staff
Republic of Ireland expatriate association footballers
Irish expatriate sportspeople in the United States
Expatriate soccer players in the United States
Irish expatriate sportspeople in South Africa
Expatriate soccer players in South Africa